The lesser thrush eel, also known as the common worm eel and the spaghetti eel, (Moringua microchir) is an eel in the family Moringuidae (spaghetti/worm eels). It was described by Pieter Bleeker in 1853. It is a tropical, marine eel which is known from East Africa, Samoa, the Ryukyu Islands, and the southern Great Barrier Reef. It typically dwells at a depth range of 3–20 m, with juveniles inhabiting estuaries and rivers, adult females leading a benthic lifestyle in shallow oceanic waters, and adult males living in the pelagic zone. Adults breed offshore. Males can reach a maximum total length of 47 cm.

The lesser thrush eel's diet consists primarily of crustaceans and bony fish.

References

Moringuidae
Fish described in 1853